Dakneshwori Municipality (Nepali: डाक्नेश्वरी नगरपालिका) is located in Saptari District in Madhesh Province of Nepal. It was formed in 2016 occupying current 10 sections (wards) merging previous Kabilasha, Hariraha, Tarhi, Bhuthi, Pato, Aurahi, Brahampur, Gamahariya Parwaha, Patthargada and Banaula VDCs. It occupies an area of 69.11 km2 with a total population of 44,782.
Dakneshwori Municipality is named after the famous temple Dakneshwori Bhagwati located at ward no. 5, Pato.

Geography 

Dakneshwori is one of 9th municipality in Saptari District. The municipality is fully Terai that links Nepal with local Indian Market to its South, Bode Barshain Municipality to its west, Belhi Chapena Rural Municipality to its East and Khadak Municipality, Sambhunath Municipality and Rupani Rural Municipality to its North.

The major rivers like Judi, Khadak, Thalaha and Koshi Projects canals passing through the different wards have been the main sources of irrigation water supplies along with creating the boundaries with the neighboring wards and municipalities.

Economy 

This place is an agricultural area, however the Indian border being close, some people are engaged on commercial and trading too. The economy of Dakneshwori Municipality center around the trade, service and business. Some depends upon seasonal fruits like Mango. The main aspect of business in Dakneshwori involve bank, Education, transport, and small hotels. Being new municipality only few of bank, Financial institute and co-operative societies operate from here. Depend upon the agriculture and agricultural products sold in the nearest town Rajbiraj about 17 km (11 mi) and Kalyanpur.  However most people get their basic ready-made goods from India. These traditional market called hatbajar are small bazaars and people can sell goods (especially vegetables, fruit, pulses, Fish, meat, earthenware, clothes etc.) two days of per week every hatbajar. There are small hatbajar (place where goods are sold) within the municipality.

These hatbajar are :

 Pato Hatiya at Pato
 Patthargada Hatiya at Patthargada
 Brahampur Hatiya at Brahampur
 Tarhi Hatiya at Tarhi
 Banaula Hatya at Banaula
 Amarlati Hatiya at Amarlati Chowk

Transportation 
Dakneshwori Municipality is connected from North to South by Kathauna - Pato Road. It connects to India.

Climate 
Dakneshwori Municipality has particularly a tropical climate. The three main seasons, summer, monsoon and winter respectively. Being located in the Plain (Terai) lands of Nepal, the climate and weather around the municipality is usually hot. Early April to August the environment copes summer season ranging the temperature from 23 °C (73 °F) to 44 °C (111 °F). Monsoons arrive in the month of July heralded by dust and thunderstorms. The winter part of the year prevails from the month of October to March. Humidity, which prevails during monsoons, diminishes at the arrival of winters. The village observes pleasant sunny days and enjoyable cool nights with the temperature ranging from 6 °C (41 °F) to 30 °C (86 °F).

Dakneshwori winter season is the most pleasant time. Overall the January is the coldest month and June is the most hottest month in the year.

Festivals and celebrations 
Majority of the people in this locality is Hindu, they follows festivals like Vijaya Dashami, Dipawali, Chhath , Holi, Ram Navmi, Janai Purnima or Rakshabandhan, Saraswati Puja or Vasant Panchami, Jeetiya, Chauthi Chan, Vishwakarma Puja, Govardhan Puja, Bhai Tika, Chaite Dashain and so on. Some Muslims here too follows Bakra Eid. The Dashain, Deepawali, Chhath and Holi are heavily celebrated with full devotee and proper rules. The locals people take pride in the way these festivals are celebrated with joy and happiness.

Religious places 

 Dakneshwori Temple at Pato
 Bishnu Temple at Banaula
 Kabileshwor Mahadev at Kabilasha
 Ram Janki Temple at Bhuthi
 Hanuman Temple at Kushaha
 Radha Krishna Temple, Patthargada

Health 
The health post located in different 9 wards provide regular vaccination program and monthly vaccination programs along with the maternity services throughout the municipality with the help of Women volunteer. It provides medicines to the poor people. It also provides birth control device like condoms and pills at zero cost. In severe case, the patients are referred to Gajendra Narayan Singh Sagarmatha Zonal Hospital (a zonal hospital) located in Rajbiraj and hospitals at Biratnagar and Dharan.

Education 
Dakneshwori Municipality occupies 14 Primary, 1 Lower-secondary, 7 secondary and 2 high schools. There are 25 schools including a special Muslim-oriented school all around 10 wards.

School 

 Shree Sakhuwa Lachhanpatti Pokhariya Higher Secondary School, Patthargada
 Janta Rameshwor Higher Secondary School, Brahampur
 Kant Chand Higher Secondary School, Pato
 Shree Janta Higher Secondary School, Tarhi
 Shree Higher Secondary School, Kabilash
 Shree Janta Higher Secondary School, Kataiya Phattepur
 Shree Janata Secondary School,Hariraha,Basantpur

See also 

Pato
Saptari
Dakneshwori Temple

References 

Populated places in Saptari District
Nepal municipalities established in 2017
Saptari District
Municipalities in Madhesh Province